Hacımusa is a small belde (town) in Zonguldak Province, Turkey

Hazımusa is in Gökçebey ilçe (district) of Zoımguldak Province at   Its distance to Gökçebey is about. The population of the belde was 1207 as of 2010

References

Populated places in Zonguldak Province
Gökçebey
Towns in Turkey